Allan Aerodrome  is located  south of Allan, Saskatchewan, Canada.

See also
List of airports in Saskatchewan

References 

Registered aerodromes in Saskatchewan